Edward Cowley is a New Zealand-Samoan entertainer and fa'afafine.

As a drag queen called Buckwheat  (after the Our Gang character), Cowley has thirty years experience on the Auckland entertainment scene, including national television, events with national politicians, hosting an annual flight from New Zealand to the Sydney Mardi Gras and been party to a high-profile media standards complaint. He is a regular feature of the Auckland Pride Parade.

Cowley worked for the New Zealand AIDS Foundation for almost ten years, working in Pacific and Men's outreach.

Cowley competed at the 2010 Cologne Gay Games, coming fifth in the body building. His preparation was filmed for a 20/20 special on drag queens losing weight. He also competed in charity boxing.

References

New Zealand people of Samoan descent
New Zealand drag queens
People from Auckland
Fa'afafine
New Zealand entertainers
Year of birth missing (living people)
Living people
Non-binary drag performers